Edeh may refer to:

 Chidi Edeh (born 1987), Nigerian football player
 Father Edeh, founder in 1999 of Madonna University in Nigeria
 Ifeanyi Edeh (born 1996), Nigerian professional footballer
 Rosey Edeh, a Canadian television personality